Degerfors Municipality (Degerfors kommun) is a municipality in Örebro County in central Sweden. Its seat is located in the town of Degerfors.

The northern part of the municipality was before 1925 part of Karlskoga Municipality, from which it was detached to form a new entity. It became a market town (köping) in 1943. In 1967 it was amalgamated with a part of the dissolved Svartå Municipality.

Riksdag elections

Twin towns
Degerfors two twin towns with the year of its establishing:

(1985) Oedheim, Germany 
(1990) Ventspils District, Latvia

See also
Vindeln Municipality, Västerbotten County, which up until 1969 had the same name.

References

External links

Degerfors Municipality - Official site

 
Municipalities of Örebro County